The 1999 PruTour was the second edition of the Prudential Tour of Britain cycle race and was held from 23 May to 29 May 1999. The race started in Westminster and finished in Edinburgh. The race was won by Marc Wauters of the  team.

Teams
Eighteen teams of up to six riders started the race:

 
 
 
 
 
 Acceptcard
 
 
 
 Team Men's Health
 Harrods
 
 Great Britain
 Australia
 China
 Denmark
 Ireland
 South Africa

Route

General classification

References

1999
Tour of Britain
Tour of Britain
PruTour